Tory Marie Arnberger-Blew (May 3, 1993) is an American politician who has served in the Kansas House of Representatives since January 2017. She represents the 112th district in Barton County, Kansas. She is from Great Bend, Kansas. Arnberger announced her candidacy while a senior at Fort Hays State University. She was the youngest member of the Kansas Legislature from 2017 to 2021 and during the 2019-2020 session served as vice chairman of the House General Government Budget Committee and as a deputy majority whip. Representative Arnberger serves as vice chairman of the Federal and State Affairs Committee for the 2021 - 2022 session. In 2022, Representative Arnberger-Blew was elected as the House Majority Whip. She also was the chair of Kansas Young Republicans in 2021-2022 and currently serves as their National Committeewoman.

Representative Arnberger graduated with a degree in Business Education and worked as a teacher in a rural school district. Currently she works for the family business, Pryor Automatic Fire Sprinkler, as their Human Resources Director.

Arnberger married her husband, Justin Blew, on September 26, 2020.

2021-2022 Kansas House of Representatives committee assignments
Vice Chairman of Federal and State Affairs
Health and Human Services
General Government Budget
2021 Special Committee on Mental Health Modernization and Reform 
2021 Special Committee on Child Support Enforcement and Collection

2019-2020 Kansas House of Representatives committee assignments
Vice Chairman of General Government Budget
Federal and State Affairs
Health and Human Services
2020 Special Committee on Mental Health Modernization and Reform

2017-2018 Kansas House of Representatives committee assignments
Federal and State Affairs
Education
Agriculture and Natural Resources Budget

References

Living people
Republican Party members of the Kansas House of Representatives
21st-century American politicians
21st-century American women politicians
Educators from Kansas
American women educators
Women state legislators in Kansas
Fort Hays State University alumni
People from Great Bend, Kansas
1993 births